Nimpkish Lake Provincial Park is a provincial park on northern Vancouver Island, British Columbia, Canada on Vancouver Island.  The park is  3,949 ha. in area and was established on 1995.  It is 32 km south of Port McNeill and on the southwest side of Nimpkish Lake.  Primary access is by boat launch, though radio-controlled logging roads lead to the edge of the park.  Western Forest Products in Woss, British Columbia should be contacted for road advisories.  The park is in the traditional territory of the Namgis First Nation.

The M/V Nimpkish in the BC Ferries fleet is named after the lake.

See also 
 Lower Nimpkish Provincial Park
 Nimpkish River

References

Provincial parks of British Columbia
Northern Vancouver Island
1995 establishments in British Columbia
Protected areas established in 1995